Bootleg or bootlegging most often refers to:

 Bootleg recording, an audio or video recording released unofficially
 Rum-running, the illegal business of transporting and trading in alcoholic beverages, hence:
 Moonshine, or illicitly made and/or distributed alcohol

Bootleg(s), bootlegger(s), bootlegged or bootlegging may also refer to:

Apparel
 Bootleg trousers, a kind of bell-bottomed trousers
 Bootleg, a brand name used by C. & J. Clark for children's shoes and trainers
 The upper part of a boot

Arts, entertainment, and media

Film and television
 Bootleg (TV series), a 2002 miniseries for children
 Bootleggers (1961 film), a Soviet short film about alcohol bootlegging
 Bootleggers (1969 film), an Italian-Spanish crime-action film
 Bootleggers (1974 film), an American crime film
 Bootleg (1985 film), a 1985 Australian film
 Bootlegger (2021 film), a 2021 Canadian film

Music
 "Boot-Leg", a song by Booker T & the MG's
 Bootleg (Bad News album), released 1988 
 Bootleg (Downchild Blues Band album), released 1971
 Bootleg (Larry Norman album), released 1972 
 Bootleg (Tempest album), released 1991
 Bootleg (Kenshi Yonezu album), released 2017
 Bootlegs (Kristy Thirsk album), released 2000
 Bootleg, a 2004 album by Avenue D
 Bootleg, a 2007 album by Eric's Trip
 "Bootleg", a song by Creedence Clearwater Revival from Bayou Country
 "Bootleg", another term for a mashup

Other media
 Bootleg (character), fictional superheroine in the comic book New Men
 Bootleg radio, also known as pirate radio
 The Bootleggers, a 1961 non-fiction book by Kenneth Allsop

Other uses
 Bootlegging (business), practicing unauthorized research activities within an organization
 Bootleg Fire, a 2021 Oregon wildfire
 Bootleg mining, a mining practice involving small, illegal mines
 Bootleg play, a tactic in American football
 Bootleg turn, a driving maneuver
 Counterfeit merchandise

See also
 "Bootleggers and Baptists", an economic theory that ostensibly opposing groups will  often support similar legal restrictions on trade
 
 Live Bootleg (disambiguation)